Glas Bheinn Mhor (997 m) is a mountain in the Grampian Mountains of Scotland, south of Glen Etive. The Argyll and Bute and Highland border straddles its summit.

A conical mountain, it forms part of the Ben Starav range and lies east of the mighty Starov itself. Climbs usually start from Glen Etive and the nearest village is Taynuilt to the south.

References

Mountains and hills of Highland (council area)
Mountains and hills of Argyll and Bute
Marilyns of Scotland
Munros